Kafr Az-Zayyat is a city in the Gharbia Governorate, Egypt. Its population was estimated at about 76,000 people in 2018. The older name of the town is Gerisan.

References 

Populated places in Gharbia Governorate